Petr Veselý may refer to:

 Petr Veselý (footballer) (born 1971), Czech football player
 Petr Veselý (canoeist) (born 1976), Czech canoeist